Qeshlaq-e Olya (also Romanized as Qeshlāq-e ‘Olyā; also known as Dūz Qeshlāq (Persian: دوزقشلاق)) is a village in Angut-e Gharbi Rural District, Anguti District, Germi County, Ardabil Province, Iran. At the 2006 census, its population was 36, in 7 families.

References 

Towns and villages in Germi County